Sargun may refer to:

 Sargun Kaur Luthra (born 1998), Indian actress
 Sargun Mehta (born 1988), Indian actress
 Burhan Sargun (born 1929), Turkish footballer